Prince Michel of Bourbon-Parma (Michel Marie Xavier Waldemar Georg Robert Karl Eymar; 4 March 1926 – 7 July 2018) was a French businessman, soldier and racing car driver, who was a member of deposed sovereign ducal House of Bourbon-Parma.

He was a son of Prince René of Bourbon-Parma and his wife Princess Margaret of Denmark. Paternally, he was a grandson of Robert I, Duke of Parma (1848–1907), while through his mother he was a great-grandson of Christian IX of Denmark. Prince Michel was also the younger brother of Queen Anne of Romania.

Biography 
Prince Michel grew up in Paris, where his father worked for a propane gas tank manufacturer. 
In 1940, Prince Michel and his family fled the German invasion and left for New York City, where his mother worked in a hat shop. Michel was enrolled in a Jesuit school in Montreal.

Three years later at age 17 he joined the U.S. Army with his father's permission and was appointed lieutenant. Serving in Operation Jedburgh, he was parachuted into Nazi-occupied France as part of a three-man sabotage team (with Maj. Tommy Macpherson and Sgt O. A. Brown) to operate deep behind German lines.

After the liberation of France Prince Michel was deployed to Indochina in order to fight against the Viet Minh. Dropped on 28 August 1945 by parachute, he was captured the same day by the Vietnamese resistance, who kept him for eleven months, during which his group of six captives attempted several escapes and were recaptured. They were led from camp to camp through the dense jungle, bound together with strips of bamboo. Each lived on a bowl of rice a day. Toward the end of the ordeal, the men were asked to sign statements saying that they had been well treated, which they refused. Four of them were killed before the two survivors finally made it back to France due to the French negotiating a ceasefire agreement with the Viet Minh at the Geneva Conference. Prince Michel was one of 3000 prisoners to survive of the 12,000 French prisoners taken by the Viet Minh. A chevalier of France's Legion of Honour, for his services during war, he was also awarded the British Military Cross and the Croix de Guerre.

Demobilized at the age of 20 the prince became a race car driver, participating in the Le Mans 24 Hours in 1964  and 1966. Both times his car failed to finish. In 1964 he also raced in the Tour de France Automobile where he finished second. At the Monaco Grand Prix
in 1967, he was a nearby spectator when the Lorenzo Bandini accident occurred: With the help of a marshal he managed to extract the driver from the burning wreck of his Ferrari.

Prince Michel started civilian life at the age of 20, engaging in business over the following decades. He worked for a company that had created the Zodiac inflatable rubber boat, which enjoyed huge commercial success after the war. Later, he negotiated contracts for French companies with Mohammad Reza Pahlavi, Shah of Iran, until he was deposed in the Islamic revolution of 1979. In later life he lived between his house in Neuilly-sur-Seine, France and his house in Palm Beach, Florida.

Marriages and children
Following a civil wedding in Paris on 23 May 1951, on 9 June 1951, the thirtieth anniversary of his parents' wedding, he married religiously at Chaillot, Princess Yolande de Broglie-Revel (1928–2014), daughter of Prince Joseph de Broglie-Revel (1892–1963) and his wife, Marguerite de La Cour de Balleroy (1901-1976).

Although the couple separated legally on 26 June 1966 and reconciled 19 December 1983, the marriage ended in divorce in 1999. They had five children together:
 Princess Inès Marie Joseph Margarethe Yolande Tatiana of Bourbon-Parma (9 May 1952 – 20 October 1981). She had a daughter out of wedlock:
 Marie Mélodie de Bourbon (born Geneva, 4 June 1977). Adopted by her grandfather, Prince Michel, 20 November 1982.
 Prince Erik Marie Joseph René Michel Pierre of Bourbon-Parma (28 August 1953 – 21 January 2021 in Copenhagen), married in Ledreborg, Denmark, on 8 August 1980 Countess Lydia af Holstein-Ledreborg (born 22 February 1955), daughter of Princess Marie Gabriele of Luxembourg, divorced in 1999. They had five children:
 Princess Antonia Monica Charlotte Marie of Bourbon-Parma (born Roskilde, 10 June 1981)
 Princess Marie Gabrielle Yolande Camilla Philippine of Bourbon-Parma (born Paris, 23 December 1982)
 Princess Alexia Thérèse Sybille Erica Marie of Bourbon-Parma (born Palm Beach, Florida, 7 March 1985), married in 2007 Fabian Davis.
 Prince Michel Knud John Joseph Marie of Bourbon-Parma (born Roskilde, 12 February 1989)
 Prince Henri Luitpold Antoine Victor Marie Joseph of Bourbon-Parma (born Roskilde, 14 October 1991). Married in 2020 to his second cousin, Archduchess Gabriella of Austria. They have two daughters: Victoria and Anastasia.
 Princess Sybil Marie Josephine Anne Victorie of Bourbon-Parma (born Paris, 10 November 1954), married in 1997 Craig Richards.
 Princess Victoire Maria Pia Joseph Philippe Isaure of Bourbon-Parma (8 November 1957 – 2001), married on 26 February 1974 in Beaumont-le-Roger and divorced before 1988,  Baron Ernst von Gecmen-Waldek (born Prague, 11 July 1943) before remarrying in 1993, with Carlos Ernesto Rodriguez. She had two children with Baron Ernst:
 Baroness Tatiana von Gecmen-Waldek (born 22 June 1974), married Michael Berger-Sandhofer in September 1995 in Versailles.
 Baron Vincent Nicholas von Gecmen-Waldek (born 30 August 1981)
 Prince Charles-Emmanuel Joseph Jacques Hély of Bourbon-Parma (born Paris, 3 June 1961), married on 25 May 1991, Constance de Ravinel (born Paris, 18 July 1971), daughter of Yves, Baron de Ravinel and his wife, Alix de Castellane-Esperron (of the Dukes of Almazán de Saint Priest). They have four children:
 Prince Amaury of Bourbon-Parma (born Amaury Yves Michel Marie Joseph in Boulogne-Billancourt, 30 October 1991), who is engaged to Pelagie de Mac Mahon, daughter of the 4th Duke of Magenta.
 Princess Charlotte  of Bourbon-Parma (born Charlotte Alexe Yolande Marie Joseph in Boulogne-Billancourt, 18 July 1993), married in June 2022, Javier Valladares Urruela.
 Princess Elizabeth of Bourbon-Parma (born Elizabeth Flore Angélique Marie Joseph in Boulogne-Billancourt, 12 June 1996)
 Princess Zita of Bourbon-Parme (born Zita Angélique Inès Marie Joseph in Boulogne-Billancourt, 1 April 1999) 

Prince Michel had a daughter out of wedlock with Laure Le Bourgeois (born 1950):
Amélie (born 13 March 1977), legally adopted by her father on 5 June 1997, assuming the surname "de Bourbon de Parme"

In 2003 he married Princess Maria Pia of Bourbon-Parma (1934), daughter of King Umberto II and Maria José of Belgium, who had divorced Prince Alexander of Yugoslavia.

Ancestry

References 

 Genealogical Data

Bibliography 
  Michel de Bourbon, En parachute, Presses de la Cité, 1949 
  Michel de Bourbon, Faldskaermsjaeger : Fra den franske maquis til Indo-Kinas jungle, Hasselbalch, 1949
  Michel de Bourbon-Parme et Jean-Louis Tremblay, Un prince dans la tourmente, Nimrod, 2010 

1926 births
2018 deaths
Nobility from Paris
Michel
Michel
United States Army personnel of World War II
United States Army officers